This is a list of episodes of the British anthology drama series, Tales of the Unexpected.

Series overview

Episodes

Series 1 (1979)
Nine episodes. First broadcast: Saturdays on ITV – 24 March to 19 May 1979

Series 2 (1980)
Sixteen episodes. First broadcast: ITV – Saturdays 1 March to 14 June 1980

Series 3 (1980)
Nine episodes. First broadcast: Saturdays, Sundays and a Friday on ITV – 9 to 30 August and 9 November to 19 December 1980

Series 4 (1981)
Seventeen episodes. First broadcast: Sundays and a Saturday on ITV – 5 April to 26 July and 26 December 1981.

Series 5 (1982–1983)
Eighteen episodes.  First broadcast: Sundays on ITV – 25 April 1982 to 2 January 1983

Series 6 (1983)
Fourteen episodes.

Series 7 (1984)
Fifteen episodes. First broadcast: Saturdays and Sundays on ITV – 12 May to 21 October 1984

Series 8 (1985)
Four episodes. First broadcast: 1 Saturday and 3 Sundays on ITV – 30 March and 14 to 28 July 1985

Series 9 (1987–1988)
Ten episodes. First broadcast: Fridays on ITV – 18 December 1987 to 29 January 1988 and 15 April to 13 May 1988

</onlyinclude>
Many of the earlier episodes were preceded by an introduction by Roald Dahl. The dancer in the title sequence was Karen Standley.

These episodes have frequently been repeated on British television, most recently on Sky Arts. All episodes have been released on DVD in a box set for each series, except the 1984–85 series, which was released together with the first episode of the eighth series.

References

External links
 

Tales of the Unexpected
Tales of the Unexpected